Kilosa (Kilossa) is a city in the Morogoro Region of Tanzania, East Africa. It is the administrative seat for Kilosa District. , the population of the town was 26,060.

Transport
Kilosa is a station on Tanzania's east-west Central Line railway, and the junction where the Mikumi line branches to the south. The new Standard Gauge Railway which will replace the Central Line is approaching completion (early 2023) and there is a new Kilosa Station.

History
The Battle of Kilosa was fought during the East African Campaign in World War I.

Notes

Populated places in Morogoro Region